AC8 or AC-8 may refer to:

 USS Neptune (AC-8), a US Navy collier ship active during World War I
 Comte AC-8, a 1930s Swiss six-seat light transport aircraft
 Southern Pacific class AC-8, a model of steam locomotive
 AC-8, an IEC Utilization Category